Annet van Egmond (born January 12, 1964, in Leiden) is a Dutch sculptor, artist and designer. She was founder, and owner of the lighting design label  “Brand van Egmond” (1989 - 2015) in Naarden. Since 2011 she is founder and owner of “Annet van Egmond Studio” in Bussum.

Biography

Annet van Egmond was  educated as a sculpturist at the Utrecht School of the Arts.

She graduated in 1989 and created, together with her ex-partner William Brand, a light sculpture;  the “Chandelier” made out of rusted steel and broken glass. In 1990 several of her hand drawn sketches were sold to the Centraal Museum in Utrecht, Kunst museum in The Hague The Netherlands.

William Brand and Annet van Egmond has created on a yearly basis new concepts of lighting sculptures. In 2007 their collection “Flower Power” received a special recognition in the ‘International Design Yearbook’ by Patricia Urquiola. The same 'Flower Power' was used for the award-winning Park POD hotel in Chennai, India. In 2008 the collection ‘Nightwatch’ was chosen by the Dutch government to decorate the VIP pavilion at the World Expo 2008 in Zaragoza, Spain. The Alden Biesen Castle in Belgium chose the 'Candles and Spirits' collection for the restoration of the 18th century 'Blaauwe Salon' ceremonial room.

In 2009 she published her first book ‘Lightsculptures’.

In 2010 Brand van Egmond introduced their 'Digital Dreams' collection; a lighting object that illuminates with digital photographs, instead of lighting bulbs or candles.

Since 2009 till 2012 she was Art Director of the Dutch wallcoverings company BN International. Her first collection ‘Shadows on the Wall’ was presented in 2010. The collection ‘Gardens of Amsterdam’ was introduced in 2011.

Notes

References 

van Egmond, Annet (2009). Lightsculptures . Terra Lannoo Publishers

https://web.archive.org/web/20120327160910/http://www.thepodhotels.in/press/vogue_may09.pdf

http://articles.chicagotribune.com/2010-08-16/classified/sc-home-0816-digital-chandelier-20100816_1_digital-frames-chandelier-travel-photos

http://design-milk.com/brand-van-egmond/

https://web.archive.org/web/20120327165121/http://lamella.myshopify.com/products/brand-van-egmond-lighting-sculptures

https://web.archive.org/web/20111001110050/http://www.framemag.com/video/1679/Gardens-of-Amsterdam-by-Annet-van-Egmond.html

External links
Website van Annet van Egmond
Website van Annet van Egmond

1964 births
Living people
Artists from Leiden
Dutch graphic designers
Utrecht School of the Arts alumni